The Iona Gaels men's basketball team represents Iona University in New Rochelle, New York in NCAA Division I competition. The school's team competes in the Metro Atlantic Athletic Conference (MAAC) and plays home games in Hynes Athletic Center. On March 14, 2020, the Gaels hired Rick Pitino as their head coach.

History
Iona University has been competing in Division I basketball since the school's inception in 1940. Iona is also one of the founding members of the Metro Atlantic Athletic Conference, which began play in men's basketball with the 1981–82 season.  The Gaels have compiled the most victories of any MAAC team since the founding of the conference and have won a league record thirteen MAAC tourney titles (1982, 1984, 1985, 1998, 2000, 2001, 2006, 2013, 2016, 2017, 2018, 2019, and 2021).  They have appeared in the NCAA tournament in 1979, 1980, 1984, 1985, 1998, 2000, 2001, 2006, 2012, 2013, 2016, 2017, 2018, 2019 and 2021, with the first two of those appearances coming as a member of the Metropolitan Conference and in 2012 as an at-large selection out of the MAAC. The Gaels have also been to 7 NITs, in 1982, 1983, 1996, 1997, 2014, 2015 and 2022.  In 2011, the Gaels made it to the final game of the CIT post-season tournament, losing at home to Santa Clara. Since the 1978-79 season, the Gaels have won 20 games or more in 23 seasons.

Postseason

NCAA tournament results
The Gaels have appeared in 16 NCAA Tournaments. Their combined record is 1–16. Iona's only NCAA Tournament victory to date, which took place in 1980, was vacated by the NCAA due to their star Center, Jeff Ruland, having signed a contract with an agent for professional representation a few months prior. Thus, NCAA record books attribute to them an 0-15 record in NCAA tournament games. The Gaels first five losses in NCAA tournament play were by a combined 11 points, including a heartbreaking buzzer-beater by Syracuse University in 1998.

+ Indicates Final Four participant.

NIT results
The Gaels have appeared in the National Invitation Tournament (NIT) seven times. Their combined record is 1–7.

CIT results
The Gaels have appeared in the CollegeInsider.com Postseason Tournament (CIT) one time. Their record is 3–1

Victories over ranked opponents
 Nov. 30, 1979: Iona 78, #14 Texas A&M 52 (Bucker Field House)
 Feb. 21, 1980: Iona 77, #2 Louisville 60 (Madison Square Garden)
 Dec. 27, 2002: Iona 65, #22 North Carolina 56 (Madison Square Garden)
 Nov. 26, 2005: Iona 89, #23 Iowa State 72 (Ames, Iowa)
 Nov. 25, 2021: Iona 72, #10 Alabama 68 (HP Fieldhouse, Orlando, FL)

Gaels in the NBA
 Richie Guerin (Naismith Memorial Basketball Hall of Fame, 2013)
 Jeff Ruland (1984 All-Star Selection)
 Steve Burtt, Sr.
 Sean Green
 Scott Machado

References
1. About the MAAC https://maacsports.com/sports/2017/6/20/GEN_0620175706.aspx

2. https://icgaels.com/facilities/hynes-athletics-center/14

3. https://www.espn.com/mens-college-basketball/story/_/id/28902504/rick-pitino-returns-college-basketball-iona-coach

4. Logo Library https://icgaels.com/sports/2017/6/26/logo-library.aspx

5. What is a Gael? https://icgaels.com/sports/2007/2/23/what-is-a-gael.aspx

External links